John Esp is a Republican member of the Montana Legislature.  He was elected to the Montana Senate in 2018 to represent Senate District 30, which includes the Big Timber area. Esp previously served in the Montana Legislature from 2001 to 2013.

References

1952 births
21st-century American politicians
Living people
Republican Party members of the Montana House of Representatives
Republican Party Montana state senators
People from Big Timber, Montana